Quaddick State Forest is a Connecticut state forest located in the town of Thompson north of Quaddick State Park. The forest protects  Quaddick Reservoir and provides opportunities for fishing, hunting, canoeing, letterboxing, and youth group camping.

References

External links
 Quaddick State Forest Connecticut Department of Energy and Environmental Protection

Connecticut state forests
Parks in Windham County, Connecticut
Thompson, Connecticut
Protected areas established in the 1930s
1930s establishments in Connecticut